William Peto (dates of birth and death unknown) was an English cricketer. Peto's batting style is unknown.

Peto made his debut in first-class cricket for Godalming against the Marylebone Cricket Club (MCC) in 1822 at The Burys, Godalming. He made seven further first-class appearances for Godalming, the last of which came against Hampshire in 1825. In his eight first-class appearances for Godalming, Peto scored 108 runs at an average of 10.80, with a high score of 18. He made a ninth and final appearance in first-class cricket for a combined Surrey and Surrey cricket team against Sussex at Petworth Park.

His brother John Peto also played first-class cricket.

References

External links
William Peto at ESPNcricinfo
William Peto at CricketArchive

English cricketers
Godalming Cricket Club cricketers